Bird Island is the name of three islands in Western Australia.

Perth region

Nearby islands to the south are Seal Island and Penguin Island, and as mentioned, Garden Island to the north.

Kimberley region
The nearest settlement is Kalumburu, the northernmost settlement in Western Australia. The islands are several hundred kilometers north-east of Broome.

It is located near the Louis Islands in the gulf at the mouth of the King Edward River, near the Mungalalu Truscott Airbase.

See also
Islands of Perth, Western Australia
Whitsunday Islands

References

Islands of the Perth region (Western Australia)
Islands of the Kimberley (Western Australia)